Same-sex marriage in Bonaire, Sint Eustatius and Saba has been legal since 10 October 2012, the effective date of legislation passed by the States General of the Netherlands enabling same-sex couples to marry.

The Caribbean Netherlands were the first jurisdiction in the Caribbean to legalise same-sex marriage, and were followed a few months later by French Caribbean territories, including Guadeloupe and Martinique, in May 2013.

Background
In 1954, the islands of Aruba, Curaçao, Bonaire, Sint Maarten, Saba, and Sint Eustatius became a constituent country of the Kingdom of the Netherlands, known as the Netherlands Antilles. Aruba seceded from the Netherlands Antilles in 1986 to become its own separate constituent country within the Kingdom. The Netherlands Antilles was dissolved in 2010; Curaçao and Sint Maarten joined Aruba in becoming autonomous constituent countries, while Saba, Bonaire and Sint Eustastius became special municipalities of the Netherlands proper. Voters in Saba and Bonaire had voted for integration into the Netherlands in referendums in 2004, while Sint Eustastius had voted against integration in 2005. Under the law of the Netherlands Antilles, same-sex couples were not permitted to marry, despite same-sex marriage having been legalised in the Netherlands proper in 2001.

Same-sex marriage law

As the States General of the Netherlands was debating legislation to establish the Caribbean Netherlands, MPs Johan Remkes and Ineke van Gent introduced an amendment to open marriage to same-sex couples on the islands. The government of Prime Minister Mark Rutte announced it preferred to negotiate the change with the islands first. The issue was particularly controversial on the island of Sint Eustatius, with many Christian islanders opposing the principle of the law and because of the perceived "neocolonialism" of the Netherlands imposing such a law on its overseas municipalities. The Island Council also passed a resolution opposing same-sex marriage.

The law, known as the Implementation Act Public Entities Bonaire, Sint Eustatius and Saba, was passed by the Parliament, received royal assent by Queen Beatrix of the Netherlands on 17 May 2010, and took effect on 10 October 2010. This established the Caribbean Netherlands, and incorporated Saba, Sint Eustatius and Bonaire into the Netherlands proper as special municipalities. The islands were given a civil code, and Netherlands Antilles legislation was gradually replaced with Dutch legislation over the following years. The Second Amendment Act Public Bodies Bonaire, Sint Eustatius and Saba, in force since 1 January 2011, amended the Civil Code to insert two clauses ensuring recognition of marriages and registered partnerships performed abroad, including in the Netherlands, and providing these unions with the same treatment as the marriages and partnerships of opposite-sex couples. It was expected that provisions permitting same-sex marriages to be solemnised on the islands would come into effect within two years.

Legislation to legalise same-sex marriage on the islands took effect on 10 October 2012. Article 1:30 of the Civil Code was changed from "Marriage can only exist between a man and a woman" to: 
in Dutch: 
in Papiamento: 
 (A marriage can be entered into by two persons of different or of the same sex)

The first same-sex marriage in Saba was performed on 4 December 2012 between Cedeno Xiomar Gonzalez, an Aruban, and Israel Ernesto Ruiz Pinto, from Venezuela, who were both residents of Aruba. The first same-sex wedding in Bonaire was performed in May 2013 between Aruban-Venezuelan couple Jean Ardley Baiz and Norbert Miguel Torrealba, and the first public same-sex marriage in Sint Eustatius took place in December 2019 in Oranjestad between Walter Hellebrand and Christopher Russell, though several same-sex couples had already married in Sint Eustatius in private ceremonies.

See also
 LGBT rights in Bonaire
 LGBT rights in Sint Eustatius
 LGBT rights in Saba
 Same-sex marriage in the Netherlands
 Same-sex marriage in Aruba, Curaçao and Sint Maarten
 Recognition of same-sex unions in the Americas

References

Bonaire, Sint Eustatius and Saba
Bonaire, Sint Eustatius and Saba
LGBT rights in Sint Eustatius
LGBT rights in Saba
LGBT rights in Bonaire
2012 in LGBT history
Same-sex marriage in North America